John Mather Austin (26 September 1805 – 20 December 1880) was a Universalist clergyman in New York State, and editor of the Universalist weekly newspaper the Christian Ambassador. He was a close associate of William H. Seward in prison reform and abolition efforts.

References

External list
 

1805 births
1880 deaths
American Christian universalists
19th-century American clergy